The National Library of Chile is the national library of Chile. It is located on the Avenida Libertador General Bernardo O'Higgins in Santiago, in a building completed in 1925, though its history reaches to the early nineteenth century before it was relocated to its current home.

History 

The Biblioteca Nacional is, together with the Instituto Nacional and a small number of institutions, one of the first institutions created by the newly formed Republic of Chile in the Patria Vieja period. In the newspaper El Monitor Araucano, a Proclama de Fundación ("Proclamation of Foundation") of the Biblioteca Nacional was published on August 19, 1813. With this vision, a call was made to all the citizens to submit their books for the formation of one great public library. As with other republican institutions, the library was closed after the Disaster of Rancagua, in which the national troops were defeated by the army of the realistas. With the victorious Battle of Chacabuco, it was reopened and supported by the government, and started to receive important collections. The Supreme Director of Chile, Bernardo O'Higgins, named professor Manuel de Salas as the first director of the Biblioteca Nacional. In 1822 Friar Camilo Henríquez (director of the Aurora de Chile newspaper) was named as the second head librarian.

Since its creation, the library had been a dependency of the Universidad de San Felipe and its successor, the Universidad de Chile, until it gained autonomy in 1852. In 1913, upon its 100th anniversary, the Biblioteca Nacional acquired the Monasterio de Santa Clara, located on the Alameda de las Delicias on present-day Cerro Santa Lucía. At the creation in 1929, the library was made into a dependency of the Dirección de Bibliotecas, Archivos y Museos.

Location 

Since 1925, Biblioteca Nacional has been situated in the centre of Santiago, Chile. It was formerly located in the square where now stands the Teatro Municipal de Santiago (Municipal Theater of Santiago).

Construction of the present building began in 1913. It was commissioned as one of the commemorative public works in honour of the first centenary of the independence of Chile. The building boasts an imposing façade of columns and arches, of very pronounced French neoclassical influence. The library shares its building with the Archivo Nacional de Chile (the National Archive). Adjoining the building is the Santa Lucía metro station, and to the east is Cerro Santa Lucía.

The interior, spread out over two main levels and a basement, has been embellished and decorated with carved marble staircases, sculptures and paintings from some of the country's classic artists, such as Alfredo Helsby and Arturo Gordon.

Collections 

The Biblioteca Nacional has an extensive and valuable collection of books and manuscripts. Several of these were acquired from or donated by their owners, making up an important national historical treasure. The most important collections include:

See also
List of national libraries
Chilean National Museum of Fine Arts
Asociación de Estados Iberoamericanos para el Desarrollo de las Bibliotecas Nacionales de Iberoamérica
Biblioteca de Santiago

References

Further reading

External links

 
Library buildings completed in 1925
Buildings and structures in Santiago
Libraries in Chile
Chile
Tourist attractions in Santiago, Chile
Education in Santiago, Chile
World Digital Library partners
National Monuments of Chile
Deposit libraries
Libraries established in 1813
1813 establishments in the Captaincy General of Chile